Waikato Rugby League is the local sporting body responsible for the administration of rugby league in the Waikato region of New Zealand. The WRL are represented by the Waikato rugby league team. They are currently part of the Upper Central Zone along with Coastline Rugby League and Bay of Plenty Rugby League.

History
The league was constituted as the South Auckland Rugby League on 28 April 1921.

Current domestic teams

Premier Division clubs 2018
Taniwharau Rugby League (Huntly) - Davies Park
Turangawaewae (Ngaruawahia) - Paterson Park
Ngaruawahia Panthers (Ngaruawahia) - League Park 
Hamilton City Tigers (Hamilton) - Resthills Park 
College Old Boys (Hamilton) - Resthills Park

Premier Reserve Division clubs for 2018
Taniwharau Rugby League (Huntly) - Davies Park
Ngaruawahia Panthers (Ngaruawahia) - League Park 
Ngaruawahia Lions (Ngaruawahia) - Patterson Park
Hamilton City Tigers (Hamilton) - Resthills Park 
Hamilton Hornets (Hamilton) - Resthills Park 
Fairfield Falcons (Hamilton) - Swarbrick Park
Hukanui (Hukanui) - Swabric Park
Morrinsville Bulls (Morrinsville)
Turangawaewae (Ngaruawahia) - Paterson Park
College Old Boys (Hamilton) - Resthills Park

Defunct clubs
Coast Steelers (Taharoa) - Taharoa Domain
Huntly South Chargers (Huntly) - Davies Park
Rangiriri Eels (Maurea)
Otorohanga Tigers (Otorohanga) - Island Reserve
Kio Kio Hunters (Maihihi) - Kio Kio United Sports Ground 
Frankton Albions (Hamilton) - Swarbrick Park
Whatawhata Wolves (Whatawhata)
Jaradites Rugby League (Hamilton)
Huntly United (Huntly) - Davies Park
Cambridge Raiders (Cambridge)
Waipa Wildcats (Kihikihi)
Thames Wanderers (Thames/Coromandel)
Ohinemuri Warriors
Whaingaroa Divers (Raglan)
Glen Afton (Glen Afton)
Chartwell Lions

Past winners Premier grades
Waikato club championship winners since 1986:
1986-Huntly South def Taniwharau (Davies Park, Huntly)
1987-Frankton Albions def Huntly South (Davies Park, Huntly)
1988-Ngaruawahia Panthers def Hamilton City Tigers (Davies Park, Huntly)
1989-Turangawaewae def Ngaruawahia Panthers (Davies Park, Huntly) 
1990-Turangawaewae def Ngaruawahia Panthers (Davies Park, Huntly)
1991-Hamilton City Tigers def Ngaruawahia Panthers (Resthills Park, Hamilton)
1992-Turangawaewae def Ngaruawahia Panthers (Davies Park, Huntly)
1993-Hamilton City Tigers 50-10 Ngaruawahia Panthers (Davies Park, Huntly)
1994-Turangawaewae 30-23 Hamilton City Tigers (Davies Park, Huntly)
1995-Turangawaewae 20-15 Taniwharau (Resthills Park, Huntly)
1996-Turangawaewae 26-18 Taniwharau (Resthills Park, Huntly)
1997-Taniwharau def Turangawaewae (Davies Park, Huntly)
1998-Turangawaewae 35-18 Hamilton City Tigers (Resthills Park, Hamilton)
1999-Turangawaewae 32-22 Hukanui(Davies Park, Huntly)
2000-Turangawaewae def Hamilton City Tigers (Davies Park, Huntly)
2001-Hukanui def Turangawaewae (Davies Park, Huntly)

Between 2002 - 2007 Waikato aligned itself with Coastlines and the Bay of Plenty to create the Waicoa Bay Championship:
2002-Taniwharau def Turangawaewae (Davies Park, Huntly)
2003-Turangawaewae def Taniwharau (Davies Park, Huntly)
2004-[Ngongotaha def Ngaruawahia Panthers (Puketewhero Park, Rotorua)
2005-Turangawaewae def Hamilton City Tigers (Davies Park, Huntly)
2006-Turangawaewae def Taniwharau (Davies Park, Huntly)
2007-Taniwharau 24-18 Turangawaewae (Davies Park, Huntly)
2008-Taniwharau 40-4 Otumoetai Eels (Davies Park, Huntly)
The Waikato club championship resumed in 2009
2009-Taniwharau 16 - 2 Ngaruawahia Panthers (Davies Park, Huntly)
2010-Hamilton City Tigers 19-12 Taniwharau (Resthills Park, Hamilton)
2011- Ngaruawahia Panthers 24-4 Hamilton City Tigers (Davies Park, Huntly)
2012- Hamilton City Tigers 34-4 Taniwharau (Davies Park, Huntly)

WaiCoa Bays Championship resumed in 2011:
2011- Hamilton City Tigers 26-6 Taniwharau (Resthills Park, Hamilton)
2012- Hamilton City Tigers 26-12 Ngaruwahia Panthers (Davies Park, Huntly)

Bay of Plenty Clubs break away from the competition, Leaving it as The "WaiCoa Championship"
 
2013- Taniwharau 18-16 Hamilton City Tigers (Resthills Park, Hamilton)
2014-  Taniwharau 20-18 Otumoetai Eels (Davies Park, Huntly)

The Waikato club championship resumed in 2015:
2015- Hamilton City Tigers 33 - 12 Taniwharau (Davies Park, Huntly)

WaiCoa Bays Championship resumed in 2016:
2016- Hamilton City Tigers 24 - 19 Pacific (Resthills Park, Hamilton)

The Waikato club championship resumed in 2017:
2017- Taniwharau 16 - 14 Hamilton City Tigers (Davies Park, Huntly)
2018- Taniwharau 28 - 12 College Old Boys (Davies Park, Huntly)
2019- Taniwharau 28 - 22 College Old Boys (Resthills Park, Hamilton)

National competitions
The Waikato rugby league team has competed in New Zealand Rugby League competitions, notably the Lion Red Cup as The Waikato Cougars and Bartercard Premiership. They were represented in the Bartercard Cup by the Waicoa Bay Stallions a team that represented Waikato, Coastlines and Bay of Plenty.

Players of note
Brad Clark - (Huntly South) Melbourne Storm, Canterbury Bulldogs, Penrith Panthers, NZ Maori
Tawera Nikau - (Rangiriri Eels) *Kiwis, NZ Maoris, Castleford, Cronulla Sharks, Melbourne Storm
Wairangi Koopu - (Taniwharau) *Kiwis, NZ Maoris, NZ Warriors, Melbourne Storm
Tukere Barlow - (Hamilton City Tigers) NZ Maoris, Warrington Wolves
Martin Moana - (Huntly South) *Kiwis, NZ Warriors, Halifax
Lance Hohaia - (Taniwharau) *Kiwis, NZ Warriors, Kiwis Rugby League World Champion 2008, Saint Helens
Sam Rapira - (Hukanui) *Kiwis, NZ Warriors, Kiwis Rugby League World Champion 2008
Steve Rapira - (Hukanui) NZ Warriors Juniors 2008, North Queensland Cowboys, NZ Warriors
Kurt Kara - (Turangawaewae) NZ Warriors Juniors 08' 09', Newtown Jets
Herewini Rangi - (Taniwharau) NZ Warriors 2004, Wynnum Manly Seagulls, Australian Bush Footy
Aoterangi Herangi - (Turangawaewae) NZ Warriors 2004, Wynnum Manly Seagulls 
Jesse Royal - (Turangawaewae, Ngaruawahia Panthers) Penrith Panthers, Newcastle Knights, NZ Warriors
Tainui Raihe - (Taniwharau, Hamilton City Tigers) NZ Maoris, Waikato 1998-2000
Hekewaru Muru - (Turangawaewae) NZ Maoris, Waikato Rugby League
Shaun Kenny-Dowall - (Turangawaewae, Ngaruawahia Panthers) *Kiwis, NZ Maoris, Waikato Rugby League, Sydney Roosters, NRL All Stars
Isaac John - (Turangawaewae, Pacific Sharks) NZ Warriors, Penrith Panthers
Sam Perrett - (College Old Boys) Sydney Roosters, Bulldogs, NZ Maoris, NZ Kiwis
Zoram Watene - (College Old Boys) Penrith Panthers u/20s 2007, Winsor Wolves 2009-2012, Auckland Vulcans 2013
Malakai Watene-Zelezniak - (College Old Boys) Penrith Panthers u/20s 2008, Winsor Wolves 2011, Auckland Vulcans 2013
Dallin Watene-Zelezniak - (College Old Boys) Penrith Panthers u/20s 2013, NSW u18s 2013, Australian Schoolboys 2013
Louis Anderson - (Taniwharau) NZ Warriors,  Kiwis 2004-06, Tonga
Donavan Briggs - (Hamilton City Tigers) Cronulla Sharks u/18s 2015/2016 New Zealand Kiwis u/16s 2014
Harlan Lawrence Rawiri Collins - (Taniwharau) Manly Sea Eagles u/20s 2015
Dylan Rintoul - (College Old Boys) Canterbury Bulldogs u/20s 2013
Te Maire Martin - (Turangawaewae)
West Tigers u/20s 2014/2015 Penrith Panthers 2016
Morgan Harper - (Ngaruawahia Panthers) Manly-Warringah Sea Eagles
Austin Dias - (Turangawaewae) West Tigers

References

Rugby league governing bodies in New Zealand
Rugby league in the Waikato